Formed in 1897 by Camelon F.C., Dunblane F.C., East Stirlingshire F.C., Fair City Athletic F.C., Falkirk F.C., Kilsyth Wanderers F.C., King's Park F.C., St Johnstone F.C. and Stenhousemuir F.C..
This Scottish football competition was basically a continuation of the Midland Football League in Scotland and Central Football League.

Champions
 1897–98 East Stirlingshire
 1898–99 Stenhousemuir
 1899–1900 Falkirk
 1900–01 Stenhousemuir
 1901–02 Stenhousemuir
 1902–03 Alloa Athletic
 1903–04 unfinished

Membership 
 Alloa Athletic 1898–1903
 Bathgate 1902–04
 Bo'ness 1901–04
 Broxburn F.C. 1902–04
 Camelon 1897–1903
 Clackmannan 1898–1901
 Dunblane F.C. 1897–1904
 Dunipace F.C. 1900–01
 East Fife 1903–04
 East Stirlingshire 1897–99, 1903–04
 Fair City Athletic F.C. 1897–98
 Falkirk 1897–1902
 Hearts of Beath F.C. 1903–04
 Kilsyth Wanderers F.C. 1897–1900
 King's Park 1897–1904
 St Johnstone F.C. 1897–98
 Stenhousemuir 1897–1903

See also
 Central League
 Midland League
 Scottish Football (Defunct Leagues)

References

External links

Defunct football leagues in Scotland